Manca Fajmut (born 26 November 1990) is a Slovenian table tennis player. Her highest career ITTF ranking was 176.

References

1990 births
Living people
Slovenian female table tennis players